Pame Glody Kilangalanga (born 8 August 1999) is a Congolese professional footballer who plays as a striker.

Club career
On January 31, 2021, Kilangalanga signed a one year contract with Algerian club JS Kabylie.

References

External links
 
 

Living people
1999 births
Democratic Republic of the Congo footballers
Democratic Republic of the Congo under-20 international footballers
Association football forwards
AS Maniema Union players
CS Chebba players
JS Kabylie players
Tunisian Ligue Professionnelle 1 players
Algerian Ligue Professionnelle 1 players
Democratic Republic of the Congo expatriate footballers
Democratic Republic of the Congo expatriate sportspeople in Algeria
Democratic Republic of the Congo expatriate sportspeople in Tunisia
Expatriate footballers in Algeria
Expatriate footballers in Tunisia
21st-century Democratic Republic of the Congo people